Dorsomedial nucleus can refer to:

 Dorsomedial hypothalamic nucleus
 Medial dorsal nucleus of the thalamus